Raja Mahendra Pratap (1 December 1886 — 29 April 1979) was an Indian freedom fighter, journalist, writer, revolutionary, President in the Provisional Government of India, which served as the Indian Government-in-exile during World War I from Kabul in 1915, and social reformist of British India. He also formed the Executive Board of India in Japan in 1940 during the Second World War. He formed the original Indian National Army (Azad Hind Fauj) in 1915 in Kabul which was supported by many Nations including Japan. He also took part in the Balkan War in the year 1911 along with his fellow students of Muhammadan Anglo-Oriental College. He is popularly known as "Aryan Peshwa".

Early life 
Pratap was born in the ruling Jat family of the state of Mursan in the Hathras district of Uttar Pradesh on 1 December 1886. He was the third son of Raja Ghanshyam Singh. At the age of three, Raja Harnarayan Singh of Hathras adopted him as his son. He was married to Balveer Kaur belonging to the ruling Sidhu Jat family of Jind, a princely state of Haryana (then in Punjab) in 1902 while studying in college.

Education
In 1895 Pratap was admitted to the Government High School in Aligarh, but soon he switched over to the Muhammadan Anglo-Oriental Collegiate School which later on became Aligarh Muslim University Here he received his education under British Headmasters and Muslim teachers all from Muhammadan Anglo-Oriental College Aligarh founded by Sir Sayed Ahmad Khan.

Nobel prize nomination 
He was nominated for the Nobel Peace Prize in 1932. N.A. Nilsson, his nominator, had said about him —

While nominating for the Peace Nobel Prize, the nominator in a short biography, gave Singh's status as follows: Singh "is the editor of the World Federation and an unofficial envoy of Afghanistan. The nominator wrote a short biography as well as international political activities. Particularly his role in the Indo-Turco-German mission was highlighted. For instance, Kaiser Wilhelm of Germany and Sultan Mohemmod Rishad of Turkey gave him letters for the Afghan King. He arrived in Kabul on Oct. 2, 1915. On December 1, 1915, a Provisional Government for India was organised. Pratap was declared as its President. In 1917 he went to Russia and met Trotsky at Leningrad. From there he came back to meet Kaiser and Sultan, to give the message of the King of Afghanistan. He passed some time in Budapest and Switzerland. He was brought by German aeroplane to Russia, where he met Lenin. From there he went to Afghanistan. King Amanullah sent him on a mission to China, Tibet, Japan, Siam, Germany, Turkey and the U.S.A. After an agreement with the British, the King lost interest in Pratap. In the end, it is summarized: “He is primarily on an unofficial economic mission of Afghanistan. However, being born as an Indian he also wanted to expose the British brutalities in that land of the idealist Americans. At this juncture, when the great freedom movement of India is developing with large momentum it is in the interest of the spiritually minded as well as business people to study carefully this new phenomenon of our social life. …. He hopes to achieve some practical results in this direction during his present sojourn in this country (U.S.A.). He is planning to establish an Afghanistan information bureau and an office of the World Federation at Washington, D.C. He just tries to do his duty according to his best understanding and leaves the working of fate to the Laws of Nature!".. "It will be of interest to know – Why a Swede nominated Singh? The answer is to be found in the documents, which were sent with the nomination letter. Namely, Singh supported the idea of “World Federation”, about which N.A. Nilsson, propagated in 1910, as is evident from: “Fédération Internationale – Discours Au – xviii Congrés Universel de la paix (International Federation – Speeches in – xviii Universal Congress of Peace)."

Freedom movement
In spite of objections from his father-in-law, Pratap went to Kolkata in 1906 to attend the Congress session, and met several leaders involved in the Swadeshi movement, deciding to promote small industries with indigenous goods and local artisans.

In January 1915, on learning about his presence in Switzerland, Chatto alias Virendranath Chattopadhyay of the newly founded Berlin Committee (Deutsche Verein der Freunde Indien) requested Von Zimmermann of the German foreign ministry to get Pratap invited to Berlin. Already Chatto had sent a first mission to Afghanistan led by the Parsi revolutionary Dada Chandaji Kerhasp.

Informed about Chatto's activities from Shyamji Krishnavarma and Lala Hardayal, Pratap insisted on meeting the Kaiser Wilhelm II personally; Chatto rushed to Geneva to tell Pratap of the Kaiser's eagerness to see him, and they went to Berlin together. Har Dayal, too, followed them. Decorating Pratap with the Order of the Red Eagle, the Kaiser showed his awareness of the strategic position of the Phulkian States (Jind, Patiala and Nabha), if India was invaded through the Afghan frontier.

According to Pratap's wish, he was taken to a military camp near the Polish border to gain a firsthand knowledge of army policies and functioning. On 10 April 1915 accompanied by the German diplomat Werner Otto von Hentig, Maulavi Barkatullah and a few other members, Pratap left Berlin, with due credentials from the Kaiser.

In Vienna the delegation met the Khedive of Egypt who during a conversation with Pratap expressed his desire to see the end of the British Empire. On their way, in Turkey they had a visit with Enver Pasha, son-in-law of the Sultan and Defense Minister, who appointed a trusted military officer to guide them. They were received by Rauf Bey with a detachment of 2000 soldiers at Ispahan. They reached Kabul on 2 October and were greeted by Habibullah, having a number of discussions.

Provisional Government of India

On 1 December 1915 Pratap established the first Provisional Government of India at Kabul in Afghanistan as a government-in-exile of Free Hindustan, with himself as President, Maulavi Barkatullah as Prime Minister, and Maulana Ubaidullah Sindhi as Home Minister, declaring jihad on the British. Anti-British forces supported his movement, but because of obvious loyalty to the British, the Amir kept on delaying the expedition to overthrow British rule in India.

In Japan

Return to India
He returned to India after 32 years on the ship City of Paris, and landed at Madras on 9 August 1946. On reaching India,he went to Wardha to meet Mahatma Gandhi.

1957 Lok Sabha Election
He was a member of the second Lok Sabha in 1957–1962. He was elected as an independent candidate in the 1957 Lok Sabha Elections from Mathura Lok Sabha constituency defeating Bharatiya Jana Sangh (which would later evolve into BJP) candidate and the future Prime Minister of India, Atal Bihari Vajpayee, who was in the fourth position among the list of five candidates.

References

Further reading
 The Kaiser's Mission to Kabul A Secret Expedition to Afghanistan in World War 1 by Jules Stewart, I.B.Taurus 2014 
Dr. Vir Singh (2004), My Life History: 1886–1979, Raja Mahendra Pratap, 
"Mahendra Pratap (Raja)" in Dictionary of National Biography, 1974, Vol.III, pp10–11
Les origines intellectuelles du mouvement d'indépendance de l'Inde (1893–1918) by Prithwindra Mukherjee, Paris, 1986 (PhD Thesis)

External links
https://www.rajamahendrapratap.com/ 
https://web.archive.org/web/20040910013359/http://www.punjabiamericanheritagesociety.com/paf/paf2000/ghadar_ki_goonj.html
http://www.punjabilok.com/misc/freedom/history_of_the_ghadar_movement8.htm
Mahendra Pratap materials at the South Asian American Digital Archive (SAADA)
 http://shodh.inflibnet.ac.in:8080/jspui/bitstream/123456789/508/2/02_introudction.pdf

1886 births
1979 deaths
Indian independence activists from Uttar Pradesh
20th-century Indian journalists
People from Hathras district
Aligarh Muslim University alumni
Hindu–German Conspiracy
India MPs 1957–1962
Lok Sabha members from Uttar Pradesh
Journalists from Uttar Pradesh
Indian male journalists
People from Mathura district
Jat rulers